Tetinchoua was a Miami chief who had lived during the 17th century. Nicolas Perrot, a French traveler, met him in Chicago in 1671. He characterizes Tetinchoua as being "the most powerful of Indian chiefs". Perrot stated that the Miami chief could easily manage approximately five thousand warriors as evidence of his authority and power. He never lacked guarded protection of at least forty men who were even posted around Tetinchoua's tent while he slept. Although he was a leader who hardly had personable interface with his people, he was successful in his ability to communicate through subordinates who would relay orders. Despite his highly regarded warrior reputation, he was also described as being attractive and bearing a softness to his features and mannerisms according to Father Claude Dablon.

Origin of Chieftainship 
Tetinchoua was born a Miami Indian and kin to an already powerful chief. In this particular band of Indians, chiefs are born into power and respect. This differs from many Algonquian traditions in the north where they obtain leadership and power by acts and accomplishments. Tetinchoua was also characterized as an autocratic ruler who had absolute power.

Geography of Miami Indians 
The Miami Indians were known to have inhabited Wisconsin and then proceeded to migrate into northeastern Indiana, northwestern Ohio, and southern Michigan. When Europeans came into contact with the natives, they were living in western Lake Michigan. Oral tradition implies that the Miami Indians migrated to these regions in order to avoid the Iroquois War parties in Ohio. In 1658, they were settled northeast of Lake Winnebago, Wisconsin. In 1667, they were primarily in the Mississippi Valley of Wisconsin. By 1670, they were at the mouth of the Fox River in Wisconsin. In 1673, they had made their way to St. Joseph River Village and some in Kalamazoo River Village in Michigan. From 1720 to 1763, they had migrated out of Michigan and into Ohio at Miami River locations as well as near Columbus in Scioto River village. In 1831, they made it to Oklahoma on Indian Territory.

Miami Indian History Post-Contact 
Before they became the Miamis, these natives were once a branch of the Algonquian people who were a smaller section of the Illinois. They were once referred to as the Oumamik which means "people of the peninsula". This term was used when Father Gabriel Druillettes, a European missionary, was told of the tribe before making contact in 1658. Bacqueville de La Potherie, a French Royal official, waited near the entrance of the Fox River for the Miamis along with the Mascouten and Kickapoos, eventually occupying the group in 1649. The aftermath of this contact resulted in great dispersion as the Iroquois Wars began. One Miami band headed toward Mississippi territory and others toward the Illinois River. The Indiana Miami, who had arrived across the Mississippi, ultimately were forced to head back East due to them coming across the Sioux. After successful contact, Father Claude Allouez began documenting the Miami Indian tribe and their history when he had arrived in Green Bay in 1669. He founded the mission St. Francis Xavier, which also could be referred to as La Baye, and reported his findings to Claude Dablon. In 1671 Nicolas Perrot visited the groups at the edge of the Fox River that is described as a "massive multiethnic refugee village". He arrived to various lavish ceremonies when he was met by Chief Tetinchoua and the three tribes who dwelled in the Green Bay area. From 1795 to 1871 the French and American colonists made their way onto Indian territory and the U.S. eventually gained full access over the indigenous in the Indiana and Wisconsin regions. The Indiana Miami signed a series of treaties to sell their land, excluding those who were of high status and had the opportunity to avoid the removal by saving land for their families. The Indiana Miami continue to promote their Indian presence, especially politically.

Impact on Indian & French Life 
In 1671, Nicolas Perrot was adorned with great honor from the French governor, Charles de Montmagny, since he acted as a messenger between the groups involved in this contact. He was also met with favorable greetings from Tetinchoua who received him military style. The detachment sent adorned with feathers and weaponry. Peace between the Potawatomi and the Miamis was made when both groups were face to face and the Miami fired their guns that were only loaded with powder. The Potawatomi then responded in the same manner. Onontio was the name given to the governor by the Algonquian tribe since it translates to "high and majestic mountain". Every governor after Montmagny is referred to as Onontio. It is a title that gives the governor the role of a father to the Algonquian tribes. Tetinchoua was too ill and unable to join Perrot on the mission to Sault Ste. Marie which is why he had given the Potawatomi the power to act in his name. The escapade, according to the Potawatomi, would have been detrimental to his health. Tetinchoua sent his men to escort Perrot into one of the most important towns in the Miamis. He then assigned Perrot fifty men whom had the duty to guard him. In efforts to redirect Perrot's mind, he set up a "game of ball" to be played. The French had claimed possession of all land on the lakes where the river enters the lake of Lake Superior and the Potawatomi along with Perrot and missionaries were to meet these men at the mouth of Lake Superior in efforts to expand. Upon arrival, the indigenous created an alliance with these French men. In 1672 Father Claude Dablon, a missionary, made attempts at conversions. He met Tetinchoua with approximately three-thousand Miamis and was greeted amicably, yet was unsuccessful in his efforts of conversion.

Modern Miami Life & Activism 
Approximately twenty-five hundred Miami Indians continue to live in Indiana. These natives primarily live in Elkhart, the St. Joseph Counties, and in Miami, Wabash, Grant, Huntington, and Allen Counties where the tribe had originated from. A smaller portion of the Indiana Miami are located in Oklahoma, Baxter Springs, Kansas, and Missouri with some dispersed throughout different states. They are not federally funded since they lack recognition as an Indian tribe and rely on fund-raising from their community. Today, there are many who are still active in their community to restore their status as an Indian tribe.

References

Miami people
17th-century Native Americans
Native American leaders